Göran Folke Lindblom (born March 4, 1956) is a retired Swedish ice hockey defenceman. Lindblom was the highest scoring Elitserien defenceman for three seasons (1977–78, 1978–79 and 1980–81) which is a record that he shares with Magnus Johansson.

Career statistics

Regular season and playoffs

International

International resume

World Championships silver:  1981
Olympic bronze:  1984

External links

1956 births
Living people
Ice hockey players at the 1984 Winter Olympics
Medalists at the 1984 Winter Olympics
Olympic bronze medalists for Sweden
Olympic ice hockey players of Sweden
Olympic medalists in ice hockey
People from Skellefteå Municipality
Skellefteå AIK players
St. Louis Blues draft picks
Swedish ice hockey defencemen
Winnipeg Jets (WHA) draft picks
Sportspeople from Västerbotten County